Kannur Medical College is a private self-financing medical college located in Anjarakandy

References

Medical colleges in Kerala